Graveyard Classics is a cover album by American death metal band Six Feet Under. It includes cover versions of such classic rock hits as "TNT" by AC/DC, "Smoke on the Water" by Deep Purple, and "Purple Haze" by Jimi Hendrix.

It is the band's final release to feature their original logo on the cover.

Track listing

Personnel
Six Feet Under
Chris Barnes - vocals
Steve Swanson - guitars
Terry Butler - bass
Greg Gall - drums

Guest musician
John Bush - guest vocals on "Blackout"

Production
Produced by Brian Slagel
Engineered by Chris Carroll
Mixed by Brian Slagel at Morrisound Studios
Mastered by Eddy Schreyer at Oasis Mastering
Artwork
Cover art by Paul Booth
Photography by Joe Giron

References

External links
Official website

Six Feet Under (band) albums
2000 albums
Covers albums
Metal Blade Records albums